This is a comprehensive list of victories of the  cycling team. The races are categorized according to the UCI Continental Circuits rules.

2010 Caja Rural

Stage 1 Vuelta Ciclista a León, Arturo Mora
Stage 1 Volta a Portugal, Oleg Chuzhda
Stage 5 Volta a Portugal, José Herrada
Overall Cinturó de l'Empordà, José Herrada
Stage 2, José Herrada

2011 Caja Rural
 Vuelta a Asturias, Javier Moreno
Stage 3, Javier Moreno

2012 Caja Rural

Stage 1 Vuelta a Castilla y León, Manuel Cardoso
Stage 3 Vuelta a Castilla y León, Yelko Gómez
Rogaland GP, Antonio Piedra
Stage 2 Circuit de Lorraine, Francesco Lasca
Stage 2 Volta a Portugal, Francesco Lasca
Stage 15 Vuelta a España, Antonio Piedra

2013 Caja Rural

Vuelta a La Rioja, Francesco Lasca
 Vuelta a Asturias, Amets Txurruka
Stage 1, Amets Txurruka
Stage 5 Volta a Portugal, Manuel Cardoso

2014 Caja Rural–Seguros RGA

Stage 1 La Tropicale Amissa Bongo, Luis León Sánchez
Klasika Primavera, Pello Bilbao
Stage 3 Vuelta a Castilla y León, Luis León Sánchez
Stage 2 Volta a Portugal, Davide Viganò
 Mountains classification (Maillot Lunares) Vuelta a España, Luis León Sánchez
 Overall Tour du Gévaudan Languedoc-Roussillon, Amets Txurruka

2015 Caja Rural–Seguros RGA

Stage 1 Vuelta a Castilla y León, Pello Bilbao
Giro dell'Appennino, Omar Fraile
Stage 6 Tour of Turkey, Pello Bilbao
Stage 8 Tour of Turkey, Lluís Mas
Stage 4 Four Days of Dunkirk, Omar Fraile
Stage 2 Vuelta a la Comunidad de Madrid, Carlos Barbero
Stage 4 Tour of Norway, Amets Txurruka
Philadelphia International Cycling Classic, Carlos Barbero
 Overall Tour de Beauce, Pello Bilbao
Stages 1 & 4, Carlos Barbero
Stage 2, Amets Txurruka
Prueba Villafranca de Ordizia, Ángel Madrazo
Stage 5 Volta a Portugal, José Gonçalves
Stage 1 Vuelta a Burgos, Carlos Barbero
Stage 8 Volta a Portugal, Eduard Prades
 Mountains classification (Maillot Lunares) Vuelta a España, Omar Fraile
Coppa Sabatini, Eduard Prades

2016 Caja Rural–Seguros RGA

Stage 4 Étoile de Bessèges, Ángel Madrazo
 Overall  Presidential Cycling Tour of Turkey, José Gonçalves
Stage 2, Pello Bilbao
Stage 6, Jaime Rosón
 Overall Vuelta a Asturias, Hugh Carthy
Stage 1, Hugh Carthy
Stage 1 Volta Internacional Cova da Beira, Eduard Prades
Stage 2 Volta Internacional Cova da Beira, José Gonçalves
Philadelphia International Cycling Classic, Eduard Prades
Stage 7 Volta a Portugal, José Gonçalves
Stage 5 Vuelta a Burgos, Sergio Pardilla

2017 Caja Rural–Seguros RGA 
Stage 5 Tour of Croatia, Jaime Rosón
Stage 4 Rhône-Alpes Isère Tour, Justin Oien

2018 Caja Rural–Seguros RGA

Stage 2 Vuelta a la Comunidad de Madrid, Nelson Soto
Stage 4 Rhône-Alpes Isère Tour, Yannis Yssaad
Prologue Troféu Joaquim Agostinho, Rafael Reis
Circuito de Getxo, Alex Aranburu
Prologue Volta a Portugal, Rafael Reis

2019 Caja Rural–Seguros RGA

Clássica da Arrábida, Jonathan Lastra
Stage 2 Vuelta a la Comunidad de Madrid, Alex Aranburu
Stage 1 Boucles de la Mayenne, Mauricio Moreira
Stage 2 Boucles de la Mayenne, Jon Aberasturi
Circuito de Getxo, Jon Aberasturi
Stage 2 Vuelta a Burgos, Jon Aberasturi
Stage 4 Vuelta a Burgos, Alex Aranburu

2020 Caja Rural–Seguros RGA

Stage 2 Vuelta a Andalucía, Gonzalo Serrano
Stage 1 Tour de Hongrie, Jon Aberasturi
Stage 1 Belgrade–Banja Luka, Xavier Cañellas
Stage 3 Volta a Portugal, Oier Lazkano

2021 Caja Rural–Seguros RGA

Stage 3 Tour of Slovenia, Jon Aberasturi

2022 Caja Rural–Seguros RGA
Clássica da Arrábida, Orluis Aular
 Overall Volta ao Alentejo, Orluis Aular
Stages 1 & 4 (ITT), Orluis Aular
Stage 2 Ronde de l'Oise, Iúri Leitão
 National Time Trial Championships, Orluis Aular
 National Road Race Championships, Orluis Aular
Stage 1 Troféu Joaquim Agostinho, Jonathan Lastra

Supplementary statistics
Sources

References

External links

Caja